The FPS Social Security is a Federal Public Service of Belgium. It was created by Royal Order on 23 May 2001, as part of the plans of the Verhofstadt I Government to modernise the federal administration.

The FPS Social Security is responsible for the Belgian system of social security.

Organisation
The FPS Social Security is currently organised into five Directorates-General:
The Directorate-General for Social Policy
The Directorate-General for Self-employed Persons
The Directorate-General for Disabled Persons
The Directorate-General for War Victims
The Directorate-General for Social Inspection

In addition, it is also responsible for a large number of public social security institutions, such as the National Office for Social Security, the National Institute for the Social Security of the Self-employed, the National Institute for Health and Disability Insurance, the National Office for Pensions and the National Employment Office.

External links

Portal of the Belgian Social Security

Social Security
Belgium
Ministries established in 2001
2001 establishments in Belgium